Hope Bay (Spanish: Bahía Esperanza) on Trinity Peninsula, is  long and  wide, indenting the tip of the Antarctic Peninsula and opening on Antarctic Sound. It is the site of the Argentinian Antarctic settlement Esperanza Base, established in 1952.

Important Bird Area
The bay has been identified as an Important Bird Area (IBA) by BirdLife International because it supports one of the largest Adélie penguin colonies in Antarctica with around 125,000 pairs. Other birds nesting at the site include gentoo penguins, brown skuas, Antarctic terns, Wilson's storm-petrels, kelp gulls and snowy sheathbills.

History

The Bay was discovered on January 15, 1902 by the Swedish Antarctic Expedition under Otto Nordenskiöld, who named it in commemoration of the winter spent there by J. Gunnar Andersson and S.A. Duse, Toralf Grunden<Antarctica: Or, Two years amongst the ice of the South PoleISBN 0-208-01642-2> of his expedition after his ship (the Antarctic) was crushed by the ice and lost. They were eventually rescued by Argentine corvette Uruguay.

Hope Bay was also the scene of the Hope Bay incident when the only shots ever fired in anger in Antarctica took place, in 1952. An Argentine shore party fired a machine gun over the heads of a British Antarctic Survey team unloading supplies from the John Biscoe. The Argentines later extended a diplomatic apology, saying that there had been a misunderstanding and that the Argentine military commander on the ground had exceeded his authority. However, the Argentine party was given a hero's welcome upon its return to Argentina.

Historic site
The ruins of a stone hut built in January 1903 by members of the Swedish expedition can still be seen; it has been designated a Historic Site or Monument (HSM 39), following a proposal by Argentina and the United Kingdom to the Antarctic Treaty Consultative Meeting.

Research Stations

Elichiribehety Station
Elichiribehety Station better known in English by its Spanish acronym ECARE is an Uruguay summer research station in Antarctica, established by the Uruguayan Antarctic Institute on December 22, 1997 on the Antarctic Peninsula.

Esperanza Base

Esperanza Base is a permanent, all year-round Argentine research station which was established in 1952. It is operated by the Instituto Antartico Argentino and has an average of 55 inhabitants in winter. The base installations have displaced part of a penguin rookery.

Station D
The old British Station D was established here in 1945 which was occupied by thirteen persons in the austral winter. It partially burned on November 8, 1948, with the loss of two lives. A new hut was built on February 4, 1952 in a new place and took the name of Trinity House, it was closed in 1964. On December 8, 1997 the British Antarctic Survey transferred the base to Uruguay, who renamed it Teniente Ruperto Elichiribehety Uruguayan Antarctic Scientific Station (ECARE).

See also
 Andersson Nunatak
 Eddy Col
 Hope Bay incident
 Last Hill
 List of Antarctic research stations
  List of Antarctic field camps
 Scar Hills
 Summit Ridge

References

Further reading
 Antarctica. Sydney: Reader's Digest, 1985, p. 156-157.
 Child, Jack. Antarctica and South American Geopolitics: Frozen Lebensraum. New York: Praeger Publishers, 1988, p. 73.
 Lonely Planet, Antarctica: a Lonely Planet Travel Survival Kit, Oakland, CA: Lonely Planet Publications, 1996, 302–304.
 Stewart, Andrew, Antarctica: An Encyclopedia. London: McFarland and Co., 1990 (2 volumes), p. 469.
 U.S. National Science Foundation, Geographic Names of the Antarctic, Fred G. Alberts, ed. Washington: NSF, 1980.

External links
British Antarctic Survey Hope Bay Station

British Antarctic Territory
Extreme points of Earth
Bays of Trinity Peninsula
Important Bird Areas of Antarctica
Seabird colonies
Historic Sites and Monuments of Antarctica
Penguin colonies